Armchair Thriller is a British television drama series broadcast on ITV in 1978 and 1980 in two seasons. Taking the form of a sequence of unconnected serials, scripts for Armchair Thriller were adaptations of published novels and stories. Although not strictly a horror series, it did sometimes include supernatural elements. Armchair Thriller was mainly produced by Thames Television, but it included two serials from Southern Television. The format was of 25-minute episodes broadcast twice-weekly, usually screened on a Tuesday or Thursday between 8 pm and 9 pm.

Overview 
The opening titles consisted of a shadow-figure walking to an armchair and then sitting down, accompanied by music composed by Andy Mackay of pop group Roxy Music. Some trailers for the series showed the same armchair soaked in blood and a screaming, maniacal face; these received criticism from those who considered them too horrific for pre-watershed viewing. For Armchair Thriller broadcasts Thames Television changed the station ident it used; normally it showed a London landscape in daytime, but here it was the same view as though seen at night. Ratings reached more than 17 million viewers during the broadcast of the first episode of "The Limbo Connection" in May 1978.

The first series included an adaptation of Antonia Fraser's 1977 novel Quiet as a Nun. This introduced to television the character of Jemima Shore—who was later spun off into her own ITV series—and starred Maria Aitken. "Quiet as a Nun" features a cliffhanger sequence where the 'Black Nun' appeared. Other actors to appear included Ian McKellen and Denis Lawson.

Episodes

Series 1

Series 2

DVD releases 
The ten Thames-produced serials were released by Network in 2008, both as separate stories and as a box-set. The Southern Television-produced "Dead Man's Kit" and "High Tide" were released separately, in 2009 and 2010 respectively, by Simply Home Entertainment.

References

External links 
 
 Die Krimihomepage: Armchair Thriller (German fanpage)

1970s British anthology television series
1980s British anthology television series
ITV television dramas
Television series by Fremantle (company)
1978 British television series debuts
1981 British television series endings
1970s British drama television series
1980s British drama television series
English-language television shows
Television shows produced by Thames Television
Television shows produced by Southern Television